A straw mobile is a mobile made from reeds, straw or other similar material bound together with string, often forming geometric shapes such as octahedrons, and can be decorated further with craft supplies such as wood, yarn, or feathers. Such mobiles have been traditional in Eastern Europe, Northern Europe, and Russia where they may serve as symbolic or religious decorations. Modern variations can be made from materials like brass or plastic.

Name 
Different cultures have different names for straw mobiles. For example, in some Germanic cultures they are often known as himmeli (heavens), while in Slavic cultures they are known as pajak (spider).

{| class="wikitable"
|+
!Culture
!Name of straw mobile
!Notes
!Photo
|-
|Belarus
|Саламяны павук, Павук
|
|
|-
|Poland
|pająk, kierec
|Pająki are often colorfully decorated and the minimal form can use straw-only.
|
|-
|Ukraine
|Різдвяний павук
|
|
|-
|Lithuania
|sodas, liktorius, voras, žarondelis, šiaudinukai
|Sodai translates to 'Gardens' in English, it can be translated as 'Chandeliers' as well. 
|
|-
|Russia
|Паук
|
|
|-
|Finland
|olkihimmeli, himmeli
|While himmelis are no longer standard in Finnish homes, some people have taken on the tradition and revitalized it. Eija Koski has published three books on the subject.
|
|-
|Estonia
|jõulukroon, näärikroon, äll
|
|
|-
|Latvia
|puzuris, lukturis, krīģis, spurgulis
|
|
|-
|Germany
|Himmeli, eine Bastelei, die aus Strohhalmen besteht
|
|
|-
|Norway
|halmkrone, julekrone, julekrune
|
|
|-
|Swedish
|Himmeli
|Himmeli''' (from  – "heaven" and "sky") The himmeli base shape consists of 12 fragments, which symbolize the 12 months. They are used as decorations from Christmas until Midsummer. Modern himmeli are also made of plywood, paper and even plastic straws. Their purpose is to ensure a good harvest in the following year, and it functions as a home for the crop spirit. It hangs from the ceiling over the dinner table.“Himmeli.” HEMLEVA, https://hemleva.com/collections/himmeli. The larger the himmeli the larger the rye crop.
|
|}

 Shape 

Straw mobiles are geometric structures, with the main diamond pattern thought to be reminiscent of the shape of the fields that farmers used. The patterns vary from simple to extremely complex, from a diamond to an octahedron.[7] Regardless of the pattern, straw mobiless are symmetrical from their hanging points. Different patterns are created by the straw mobile as it rotates.

 Modern practice 

In addition to increased popularity in their traditional form, straw mobiles have also experienced modern twists within the craft and décor community. Alternative materials such as straws and metal tubes have become common.Bly, Brittany. “10 DIY Himmeli Tutorials That Perfectly Pair with Plants.” Pop Shop America, Pop Shop America, 12 Mar. 2019, https://www.popshopamerica.com/blog/10-diy-himmeli-tutorials-that-perfectly-pair-with-plants/. Himmelis made out of metal tubes are sold as year-round décor as opposed to solely a Christmastime fixture.“Himmeli.” Solid Oak, Solid Oak Inc., https://solidoakinc.com/collections/himmeli. Sometimes they keep the same form as a mobile, but some retailers sell himmelis designed to hold air plants or potted plants. Himmelis have even made it into high-end design. Designer Paul Loebach used himmelis as inspiration for a line of pendant lights and his designs have also been recreated by other companies.“Replica Lights.” Replica Lights. Replica Lights, https://www.replicalights.com.au/himmeli-cage-pendant-light-white-roll-hill/ Another way that himmelis have gained popularity is as a simple craft. While himmelis can be extremely intricate and complex, smaller versions are relatively easy to make, resulting in many websites creating how-to articles and suggesting it as a kid’s craft.“Make Your Own Himmeli.” Nordic Northwest, Nordic Northwest, 22 Dec. 2020, https://www.nordicnorthwest.org/post/himmeli. Some websites give a list of materials, while other retailers sell prefabricated kits with all the necessary supplies.

 Process 
The process of creating a straw mobile begins with the harvest. The best straw of the rye harvest is cut into sections about 6.5 feet long and laid out to dry. The rye changes from green to a golden brown and the process takes several weeks. Once dried, the rye is cut at the joints and separated into groups based on the thickness of the stalk. At this point the construction itself can begin. The straw is cut into sections of the desired length and thread is threaded through the hollow stems to join them together. The thread should be hidden within the straw and near invisible when viewing the himmeli.

References

 Watson Jepsen, Brittany. “Himmeli: Geometric Home Decor.” The House That Lars Built, The House That Lars Built, 15 Dec. 2016, https://thehousethatlarsbuilt.com/2016/12/himmeli-geometric-home-decor.html/. 
 The Straw Shop. “Eija Koski”. The Straw Shop''. The Straw Shop, https://thestrawshop.com/eija-koski/

External links

 Rachel Basinger (6 June 2014). How to make a himmeli sculpture. The Guardian

Sodai documentary

Straw art
Christmas decorations
Northern European culture
Eastern European culture
Russian culture
Kinetic sculptures